Calgary-North East (previously styled Calgary North East) is a provincial electoral district in Calgary, Alberta. The riding has existed twice, having been contested in the 1959 and abolished soon after, becoming Calgary East. It was re-established in time for the 2019 general election in the Legislative Assembly of Alberta.

Boundary history
The historic 1959 redistribution of the provincial ridings of Calgary and Edmonton marked the transition back to First Past the Post. From 1921 to 1959 Calgary and Edmonton, along with a few other ridings in the province elected members with Single Transferable Vote. The redistribution created seven ridings in Calgary, two of those still exist today.

This transition was done in part to standardize the electoral system across the province and because Calgary and Edmonton were becoming too large to be a single riding. The other six ridings were Calgary Bowness, Calgary West, Calgary Glenmore, Calgary Centre, Calgary South East, Calgary North.

However, the riding was abolished after only one term, becoming Calgary-East. It has been re-established by the 2017 Electoral Boundaries Commission, created from parts of Calgary-Mackay-Nose Hill and Calgary-McCall, and will be contested in the 2019 Alberta general election.

Representation history

Calgary North East was represented by Social Credit MLA Albert Ludwig for the one term it was active. He went on to represent Calgary-East and Calgary-Mountain View after it was abolished.

In 2018 and 2019, the re-created Calgary-North East saw nomination controversies for both the governing New Democrats and opposition United Conservatives, with allegations of ballot-stuffing and non-residents voting in the contests. United Conservative candidate Rajan Sawhney was elected as Calgary-North East's second representative, and appointed as Minister of Community and Social Services.

Election Results

1950s

|}

2010s
{| class="wikitable"
! colspan="4"|2015 Alberta general election redistributed results

See also
 Calgary Northeast Federal Electoral District

References

External links
The Legislative Assembly of Alberta

Alberta provincial electoral districts
Politics of Calgary